Blagoveštenje Monastery is a Serbian Orthodox monastery in Ovčar-Kablar Gorge in Central Serbia.

Establishment 
The date of establishment is subject of dispute because some authors believe it was established in 12th century while some authors point to 13th century. The first written records about the monastery are from 13th century.

The monastery consists of monastic church dedicated to Annunciation and several monastic residences and secondary objects that surrounds the church in elliptical shape, while the monastery is surrounded by tall stone walls on the Western and Southern side. The inscription above Western entrance of the monastic church says that it was built in 1602 by hegumen Nikifor and other members of monastic fraternity.

History 
The first book printed in Belgrade, Gundulić's Four Gospels, is kept in the treasury of the Monastery Blagoveštenje. It was printed in the Belgrade printing house in 1552. The Government of the Kingdom of Yugoslavia planned to evacuate most important manuscripts and old books and journals from former building of the National Library of Serbia to Blagoveštenje and packed all of them into 150 crates, but decision of Minister of Education Miloš Trifunović from 3 April 1941 canceled the evacuation.

During Užice Republic the Communists led by Josip Broz Tito confiscated 200 hectares of land owned by the monastery and gave it to poor people.

In 1948 the former Serbian Patriarch Pavle received monastic vows in the Monastery Blagoveštenje.

See also 
 List of Serb Orthodox monasteries

References

Sources

Further reading 
 

Serbian Orthodox monasteries in Serbia
Architecture in Serbia